Newtonmore is a village in the Highland council area of Scotland. The village is only a few miles from a location that is claimed to be the exact geographical centre of Scotland.

Activities 
Shinty - The town is renowned for having a shinty team, Newtonmore Camanachd Club, which plays at The Eilan next to the River Calder.
 Walking - Newtonmore calls itself the "Walking Centre of Scotland", referring both to its geographical location and to the great walking opportunities locally, like the Wildcat Trail.  An extension to the Speyside Way could soon add Newtonmore to a Long Distance Route and it will become the new end to this trail.
 Golf - Newtonmore has a golf course on the banks of the Spey.
 Bowling - The club is open to visitors.  It has regular competitions with other clubs in Badenoch and Strathspey and with clubs from Perthshire and Aberdeenshire.
 Mountain Biking - Manytrails in the local forests and tracks on the surrounding hills.
 Fishing - Both the Rivers Spey and Calder run through Newtonmore making it a popular spot.
 Shooting
Outdoor Activities - being situated almost in the centre of Scotland, and so close to Aviemore & Cairngorm Mountain makes Newtonmore extremely popular for Outdoor Activities. With local providers offering things like canyoning, white water rafting, rock climbing & abseiling.

Tourism
 
The village is home to The Wildcat Experience - a visitor attraction specially aimed at families with children. The attraction is based on a community arts project - everyone in the village had the chance to be involved.

Newtonmore is the site of the Highland Folk Museum.

Newtonmore was one of the locations used in the filming of Monarch of the Glen and is in Monarch Country.

Transport
The town has been bypassed by the A9 since 1979.

Newtonmore railway station is managed by ScotRail and is on the Highland Main Line.

Notable people from Newtonmore
 George MacPherson, Scotland national rugby union team
 Jimmy Bain, bassist for Rainbow and Dio
 Sir Tommy Macpherson, much-decorated former World War II Army officer and successful businessman.
 David "Tarzan" Ritchie, 12 Time Camanachd Cup Winner
 Norman MacArthur, ex-shinty player
 Danny MacRae, captain of Newtonmore Camanachd
 Dr John Cattanach, the only shinty player inducted into the Scottish Sports Hall of Fame
 Cameron McNeish, author, broadcaster - influential in the preservation of the countryside

See also
 Battle of Invernahavon – 14th century battle southwest of Newtonmore, in which the Chattan Confederation defeated Clan Cameron

External links
Newtonmore Community Website
Laggan Wolftrax MTB trails
Highland Folk Museum
Cairngorms Park Info and Accommodation site
VisitAviemore: Newtonmore Accommodation and Things To Do
VisitScotland: Newtonmore village information
Active Outdoor Pursuits - a local Outdoor Activity Provider

References 

Populated places in Badenoch and Strathspey